Daytime Drinking is a 2008 South Korean film directed by Noh Young-seok.

On July 20, 2009, Funimation announced that it had acquired a license to distribute this film in North America.

Plot
On a drunken night out with his friends, a broken-hearted young man is swayed into going to the countryside with them for a getaway. But when he gets there, he finds that not only have none of them showed up, but the tiny seaside town is shuttered - no shops are open, no tourists are around, the beach is freezing, and there’s no cell phone signal. Unable (and reluctant) to return to Seoul, he finds himself in the company of some very unusual locals and, subject to the rigid rules of Korean drinking culture, on an increasingly strange odyssey nursing a never-ending hangover.

Ushering in a new era of independent filmmaking in South Korea, Daytime Drinking is a comedy in the spirit of Stranger Than Paradise and Sideways, but with a distinctly Korean twist.

Cast
 Song Sam-dong as Hyeok-jin 
 Yook Sang-yeob as Ki-sang 
 Kim Kang-hee as Next-door woman 
 Lee Ran-hee as Ran-hee 
 Shin Un-seop
 Tak Seoung-jun

Festivals
 Jeonju International Film Festival 2008
 Locarno International Film Festival 2008
 Toronto International Film Festival 2008
 Vessoul Asian Film Festival 2009
 Asian Hot Shots Berlin 2009
 International Film Festival Rotterdam 2009
 SXSW Film Festival 2009
 Maryland Film Festival 2009
 Hong Kong International Film Festival 2009
 Wisconsin Film Festival 2009
 Singapore International Film Festival 2009
 Fantasia Festival 2009
 Seattle International Film Festival 2009

Awards
 JJ-Star Award / Audience Critics' Award - Jeonju International Film Festival 2008
 Special Mention of the Jury / NETPAC Award - Locarno International Film Festival 2008
 INALCO Jury Award - Vessoul Asian Film Festival 2009

International releases
The film was picked up for general release in the United Kingdom by Inclusionism Films in 2011. The UK DVD release featured an interview with director Noh Young-seok, in which he explained some of the myriad "rules for drinking" in Korean culture. The film was well received by press in the UK, with Time Out London commenting on the "winning combination of pacing and a sharp script." In 2020, the film was ranked by The Guardian number 20 among the classics of modern South Korean cinema.

References

External links
 
 
 
 Daytime Drinking at Funimation

2008 films
2008 comedy films
South Korean independent films
South Korean comedy films
2000s Korean-language films
Funimation
2008 independent films
2000s South Korean films